Donald J. Angell (born 1929) is a member of the Washington, D.C. Boxing Hall of Fame for his career as both a fighter and a manager.

Career as a boxer
Angell's fighting career began in 1945 at the age of 16 in Stratford, Connecticut. Within a year, he became team captain and assistant to the coach. In 1947, Angell expanded his career, fighting in cities throughout Connecticut.

By 1949, Angell had participated in a total of 13 fights, posting a record of 12–0–1. His success continued in the U.S. Navy as he entered his first Naval Tournament in 1950, in the Ninth Naval District Welterweight Tournament at Naval Station Great Lakes in Great Lakes, Illinois, winning all of his fights by knockout.

After service, he was selected to fight for the U.S. Naval boxing team in San Diego, California. In 1952, Angell won the Southern California Welterweight Title in Los Angeles, qualifying him to compete in the U.S. Western Regional Olympic Boxing Trials being held in San Francisco. He went on to represent the region in the U.S. Olympic Trials boxing finals held in Kansas City, Missouri, losing in the quarter finals. Angell had three more fights before undergoing a nose operation that ended his active boxing career.

Coaching career
From there, he began a career of managing and training fighters. While a student at Georgetown University, he worked with Marty Gallagher, the school's boxing coach.

In 1967, he coached Chris Fox of Annandale, Virginia to the 139 1b. AAU title and was named outstanding boxer of the tournament. Fox was the first champion fighter that Angell coached.

Angell went on to coach nationally recognized fighters, including Pete Hussey and professional fighters Keith Broom and Ed Harris. He retired in the early 1980s and currently lives in Northern Virginia.

References 

 

Boxers from Connecticut
1929 births
Living people
American male boxers
People from Stratford, Connecticut
Welterweight boxers
Georgetown University alumni